Emil A. Hinz (February 24, 1889 – January 23, 1964) was a member of the Wisconsin State Assembly.

He  was born in Proviso Township, Cook County, Illinois. During World War I, he served in the United States Army. He was a secretary of a chesse factory. Hinz died in Merrill, Wisconsin as a result of a fall down a flight of steps at an appliance store.

Political career
Hinz was a member of the Assembly from 1947 to 1962. Additionally, he was Treasurer and Chairman of Merrill, Wisconsin and a member and Chairman of the Lincoln County, Wisconsin Board of Supervisors. He was a Republican.

References

People from Cook County, Illinois
People from Merrill, Wisconsin
Mayors of places in Wisconsin
County supervisors in Wisconsin
Military personnel from Wisconsin
United States Army soldiers
United States Army personnel of World War I
1889 births
1964 deaths
Accidental deaths in Wisconsin
Accidental deaths from falls
20th-century American politicians
Republican Party members of the Wisconsin State Assembly